"The Gum" is the 120th episode of NBC sitcom Seinfeld. This was the tenth episode for the seventh season. It aired on December 14, 1995. The episode follows Kramer and Lloyd Braun's efforts to reopen the Alex Theatre, while an overprotective Kramer tries to keep Lloyd, recently recovered from a mental breakdown, from doubting his own sanity. Wardrobe mishaps make it seem like Lloyd's ex-girlfriend Elaine is coming on to him, Kramer forces Jerry to wear glasses for Lloyd's sake, and an old friend suspects 
George is going through a mental breakdown himself when she witnesses his apparent obsession with Lloyd and a cashier he claims shortchanged him.

Plot
Kramer is active in the renovation and reopening of the Alex movie theater. Lloyd Braun is using his connections in the mayor's office to try to give the theater landmark status. Kramer insists that his friends "treat Lloyd like he's one of the gang", because he had a nervous breakdown after derailing the David Dinkins reelection campaign (in "The Non-Fat Yogurt"). This includes voicing enthusiasm for Chinese chewing gum that Lloyd brought. Because Lloyd is her ex-boyfriend, Elaine does not want to sit near him at the Alex, so she says she and Jerry have to sit up front because he forgot his glasses. The seats are so close that they have to lie horizontal to watch the movie, causing popcorn to spill onto Elaine's chest. While retrieving popcorn she inadvertently plucks off her ivory button, and unknowingly exposes her cleavage to Lloyd and Kramer. She complains to a policeman that a florist washing the sidewalk with a hose is wasting water. Her open blouse convinces the policeman to order the florist to disconnect the hose.

George encounters an old friend Deena, and her father, "Pop," who had suffered a mental breakdown. Pop tinkers with George's car. The cashier at Monk's, Ruthie Cohen, gives George change for $10, when he believes he gave her a $20 bill that he doodled on. George's car catches fire due to Pop's tinkering. The florist cannot extinguish the fire because his hose was disconnected.

Kramer insists Jerry wear glasses while around Lloyd so that Lloyd will not realize he and Elaine were avoiding him. Kramer changes the glasses when he finds out that the ones he got from the theatre's lost and found belong to Geoffrey Haarwood, who runs the Institute for the Preservation of Motion Picture Costumes and Wardrobes. The new glasses blur Jerry's vision, so he inadvertently gives Lloyd a $100 bill for the Chinese gum. When Lloyd tries to purchase a hot dog, the theatre vendor asks Lloyd if he is insane, because the hot dog is clearly stale. Kramer insists on eating it to show that Lloyd is not insane, which makes him vomit on the sidewalk. The florist brings his hose back out to clean it up. Elaine confronts him about it, but he accidetally sprays her with water when he gets distracted by someone trying to get his attention. When she comes to the Alex in her wet shirt, Lloyd again believes she is trying to get his attention.

Deena tells George he is showing signs of mental illness, specifically his gloating over Lloyd's mental breakdown and his dogged insistence that Cohen shortchanged him. He tries to get Jerry to vouch for him, but Jerry fails to recognize George due to the glasses. George wears a Henry VIII costume borrowed from Haarwood for Kramer's premiere at the Alex, and discovers he still has the $20 bill. Deena sees George in the costume and runs in terror as he chases her, yelling that he "got it from the Institute". Elaine sees her ivory button on Haarwood's ascot and tries to undo it, making Lloyd and Kramer think she is flirting with him.

Production
The inspiration for "The Gum" came from assistant director Randy Carter, who was heavily involved with the reopening of the Alex Theatre and would often promote the theatre to the Seinfeld cast and crew in a manner similar to Kramer in the episode. In the initial draft of the script, Elaine thinks she has eaten her button and it is ultimately discovered in the Alex Theatre's plumbing system. Co-writer Tom Gammill's car, previously featured in "The Mom & Pop Store", was wrecked when its engine caught fire on the highway, which was worked into the episode's story.

Gammill and his writing partner Max Pross wanted to give Ruth Cohen, an extra in numerous Seinfeld episodes, a role in the story. They had first taken notice of her before they joined the writing staff, when they were just fans of the show. Cohen had never acted before and performed poorly at her audition for "The Gum", but Jerry Seinfeld petitioned on her behalf. The actor who had previously played Lloyd Braun, Peter Keleghan, had moved to Canada, so the part was reassigned to Matt McCoy.

References

External links
 

Seinfeld (season 7) episodes
1995 American television episodes